Fitz John Porter (August 31, 1822 – May 21, 1901) (sometimes written FitzJohn Porter or Fitz-John Porter) was a career United States Army officer and a Union general during the American Civil War. He is most known for his performance at the Second Battle of Bull Run and his subsequent court martial.

Although Porter served well in the early battles of the Civil War, his military career was ruined by the controversial trial, which was called by his political rivals. After the war, he worked for almost 25 years to restore his tarnished reputation and was finally restored to the army's roll.

Early life and education
Porter was born on August 31, 1822, in Portsmouth, New Hampshire, the son of Captain John Porter and Eliza Chauncy Clark. He came from a family prominent in American naval service; his cousins were William D. Porter, David Dixon Porter, and David G. Farragut. Porter's father was an alcoholic who had been reassigned to land duty. Porter's childhood was chaotic because of his father's illness. The younger Porter pursued an army career. He graduated from Phillips Exeter Academy, then from the United States Military Academy (West Point) in 1845, standing eighth out of 41 cadets, and was brevetted a second lieutenant in the 4th U.S. Artillery.

Career
Porter was promoted to second lieutenant on June 18, 1846 and First Lieutenant on May 29, 1847. He served in the Mexican–American War and was appointed a brevet captain on September 8, 1847, for bravery at the Battle of Molino del Rey. He was wounded at Chapultepec on September 13, for which he also received a brevet promotion to major. He was an original member of the Aztec Club of 1847, a military society composed of officers who served during the Mexican War.

After the war with Mexico ended, Porter returned to West Point and became a cavalry and artillery instructor from 1849 to 1853. He served as adjutant to the academy's superintendent until 1855. He next was posted to Fort Leavenworth, Kansas, as assistant adjutant general in the Department of the West in 1856; he was brevetted to captain at Fort Leavenworth that June. Porter served under future Confederate Albert Sidney Johnston in the expedition against the Mormons in 1857 and 1858. Afterward, Porter inspected and reorganized the defenses of Charleston Harbor, South Carolina, until late 1860, when he aided the evacuation of military personnel from Texas after that state seceded from the Union.

American Civil War

After the start of the Civil War, Porter became chief of staff and assistant adjutant general for the Department of Pennsylvania, but he was soon promoted to colonel of the 15th Infantry on May 14, 1861. General John A. Logan, Porter's later political nemesis, would accuse Porter of helping persuade his commander Robert Patterson to let Joseph E. Johnston's force escape out of the Shenandoah Valley and reinforce P. G. T. Beauregard, thus turning the tide at the First Battle of Bull Run. In August, Porter was promoted to brigadier general of volunteers, backdated to May 17 so he would be senior enough to receive divisional command in the Army of the Potomac, newly formed under Maj. Gen. George B. McClellan. Soon Porter became a trusted adviser and loyal friend to McClellan, but his association with the soon-to-be-controversial commanding general would prove to be disastrous for Porter's military career.

Porter led his division at the beginning of the Peninsula Campaign, seeing action at the Siege of Yorktown. McClellan created two provisional corps and Porter was assigned to command the V Corps. During the Seven Days Battles, and particularly at the Battle of Gaines' Mill, he displayed a talent for defensive fighting. At the Battle of Malvern Hill, Porter also played a leading role.

Inadvertent balloon ride
In addition, Porter had a memorable experience when he decided to make aerial observations in a hot air balloon without the assigned expert to handle the craft, Professor Thaddeus Lowe. When he ascended with only one securing line, the balloon subsequently broke loose and General Porter found himself drifting west over enemy lines in danger of being captured or killed. Fortunately, the combination of a favorable wind change and himself adjusting the gas values allowed Porter to return to the Union lines and land safely. Although it was an embarrassing accident, General Porter was able to perform his observations of enemy defences as intended and recorded his findings, although the balloon program was disbanded a year later.

For his successful performance on the peninsula, he was promoted to major general of volunteers on July 4, 1862.

Second Bull Run

Porter's corps was sent to reinforce Maj. Gen. John Pope in the Northern Virginia Campaign, a reassignment that he openly challenged and complained about, criticizing Pope personally. During the Second Battle of Bull Run, on August 29, 1862, he was ordered to attack the flank and rear of Maj. Gen. Thomas J. "Stonewall" Jackson's wing of the Army of Northern Virginia. Porter had stopped at Dawkin's Branch, where he had encountered Maj. Gen. J.E.B. Stuart's cavalry screen. On August 29 he received a message from Pope directing him to attack the Confederate right (which Pope assumed to be Jackson on Stony Ridge), but at the same time to maintain contact with the neighboring division under Maj. Gen. John F. Reynolds, a conflict in orders that could not be resolved. Pope was apparently unaware that Confederate Maj. Gen. James Longstreet's wing of the opposing army had arrived on the battlefield; the proposed envelopment of Jackson's position would have collided suicidally with Longstreet's large force. Porter chose not to make the attack because of the intelligence he had received that Longstreet was to his immediate front.

On August 30 Pope again ordered the flank attack, and Porter reluctantly complied. As the V Corps turned to head towards Jackson's right and attacked, it presented its own (and consequently the entire army's) flank to Longstreet's waiting men. About 30,000 Confederates assailed Porter's 5,000 or so men, driving through them and into the rest of Pope's forces, doing exactly what Porter most feared would come of these orders. Pope was infuriated by the defeat, accused Porter of insubordination, and relieved him of his command on September 5.

Porter was soon restored to command of the corps by McClellan and led it through the Maryland Campaign, where the corps served in a reserve position during the Battle of Antietam. He is said to have told McClellan, "Remember, General, I command the last reserve of the last Army of the Republic." McClellan took his implied advice and failed to commit his reserves into a battle that might have been won if he had used his forces aggressively.

Court martial

On November 25, 1862, Porter was arrested and court-martialed for his actions at Second Bull Run. By this time, McClellan had been relieved by President Abraham Lincoln and could not provide political cover for his protégé. Porter's association with the disgraced McClellan and his open criticism of Pope were significant reasons for his conviction at court-martial. Porter was found guilty on January 10, 1863, of disobedience and misconduct, and he was dismissed from the Army on January 21, 1863.

In describing the Battle of Second Manassas, Edward Porter Alexander wrote that Confederates who knew Porter respected him greatly and considered his dismissal "one of the best fruits of their victory".

Later life and death
After the war ended, Porter was offered a command in the Egyptian Army but declined it. He spent most of the remainder of his public life fighting against the perceived injustice of his court-martial.

In 1878, a special commission under General John Schofield exonerated Porter by finding that his reluctance to attack Longstreet probably saved Pope's Army of Virginia from an even greater defeat. Eight years later, President Grover Cleveland commuted Porter's sentence and a special act of the U.S. Congress restored Porter's commission as an infantry colonel in the U.S. Army, backdated to May 14, 1861, but without any back pay due. Two days later, August 7, 1886, Porter, seeing vindication, voluntarily retired from the Army.

Porter was involved in mining, construction, and commerce. He was appointed as the New York City Commissioner of Public Works, the New York City Police Commissioner, and the New York City Fire Commissioner.

On December 27, 1894, Porter, along with 18 others, founded the Military and Naval Order of the United States, which was soon renamed the Military Order of Foreign Wars.  Porter's name was at the top of the list of signers of the original institution and received the first insignia issued by the Order.

Porter died in Morristown, New Jersey, and is buried in Green-Wood Cemetery, Brooklyn, New York. His grave can be found in Section 54, Lot 5685/89.

Legacy

 In 1862, Camp Fitz-John Porter was established in Monroe County, NY, one mile south of Rochester, NY, on the western bank of the Genesee River. The camp was the mustering location for the 108th New York Volunteer Infantry Regiment the 140th New York Volunteer Infantry Regiment and Mack's 18th Independent "Black Horse" artillery battery. In 2008 a historical marker was erected to mark the location. 
 In 1904, a statue of Porter designed by artist James E. Kelly was dedicated in Haven Park in Portsmouth, New Hampshire.
 
 Porterstown Road in the town by the same name runs directly through the area where his forces were placed for the Battle of Sharpsburg.
 His Portsmouth home is listed on the National Register of Historic Places

See also

 List of American Civil War generals (Union)
List of people pardoned or granted clemency by the president of the United States

Notes

Bibliography
 Dupuy, Trevor N., Curt Johnson, and David L. Bongard. Harper Encyclopedia of Military Biography. New York: HarperCollins, 1992. .
 Eicher, John H., and David J. Eicher. Civil War High Commands. Stanford, CA: Stanford University Press, 2001. .
 Grant, U. S. "An Undeserved Stigma" in North American Review, Vol. 135, No. 313, December 1882, pp. 536–46.
 McPherson, James M. Battle Cry of Freedom: The Civil War Era. Oxford History of the United States. New York: Oxford University Press, 1988. .
 Sears, Stephen W. Landscape Turned Red: The Battle of Antietam. Boston: Houghton Mifflin, 1983. .
 Porter biography, Civil War Home
 Court Martial of Porter, Civil War Home

Further reading
 
 Eisenschiml, Otto, The Celebrated Case of Fitz John Porter:  An American Dreyfus Affair, Indianapolis, IN:  Bobbs-Merrill, 1950.
 Hennessy, John J. Return to Bull Run: The Campaign and Battle of Second Manassas. Norman: University of Oklahoma Press, 1993. .
 Soini, Wayne. Porter's Secret: Fitz John Porter's Monument Decoded. Portsmouth, New Hampshire: Jetty House an imprint of Peter E. Randall Publisher, 2011. .
 Paleno, Gene. "The Porter Conspiracy, A story of the Civil War", PAL Publishing, Upper Lake CA

External links
 Harriet Porter, Wife Of Union General Fitz John Porter
 

1822 births
1901 deaths
People from Portsmouth, New Hampshire
People of New Hampshire in the American Civil War
People from Morristown, New Jersey
United States Army personnel who were court-martialed
American military personnel of the Mexican–American War
Members of the Aztec Club of 1847
Burials at Green-Wood Cemetery
Union Army generals
United States Military Academy alumni
Recipients of American presidential pardons
Phillips Exeter Academy alumni
Military personnel from New Hampshire